Pavel Krmaš (born 3 March 1980) is a Czech former professional footballer who played as a defender.

References

External links
 
 
 

Living people
1980 births
People from Broumov
Czech footballers
Association football midfielders
Association football defenders
FK Náchod-Deštné players
AC Sparta Prague players
FK Teplice players
FC Hradec Králové players
SC Freiburg players
Czech First League players
Bundesliga players
2. Bundesliga players
Czech expatriate footballers
Czech expatriate sportspeople in Germany
Expatriate footballers in Germany
Sportspeople from the Hradec Králové Region